Faiq Bağırov (born 3 February 1976) is an Azerbaijani middle-distance runner. He competed in the men's 800 metres at the 2000 Summer Olympics.

References

1976 births
Living people
Athletes (track and field) at the 2000 Summer Olympics
Azerbaijani male middle-distance runners
Olympic athletes of Azerbaijan
Place of birth missing (living people)